Charmaine Laurence Häusl (born 27 January 1996) is a Seychellois professional footballer who plays as a defensive midfielder or centre-back for Regionalliga Nordost club VSG Altglienicke and the Seychelles national team.

International career
Born in the Seychelles to a German father and a Seychellois mother, Häusl is a youth international for Germany.

References

External links
 
 

1996 births
Living people
People from Greater Victoria, Seychelles
Seychellois footballers
Association football midfielders
Seychelles international footballers
Seychellois people of German descent
Citizens of Germany through descent
German footballers
1. FSV Mainz 05 II players
SG Sonnenhof Großaspach players
Berliner AK 07 players
VSG Altglienicke players
3. Liga players
Regionalliga players
Germany youth international footballers
German people of Seychellois descent
German sportspeople of African descent